Linda Ellen Evans (born December 6, 1958) is an American science fiction writer currently residing in Archer, Florida. She is an author of ten novels and four anthologies, as well as of several other co-authored novels.  In 1996 her published novels had sold more than 100,000 copies. She has been published in English, German, and Russian, as well as hardback, paperback, and book-club editions.

Early life
Evans was born December 25, 1958.  She grew up in Crawfordsville, Indiana and attended Crawfordsville High School.  After graduation she attended Flagler College in St. Augustine, Florida.

She began a career at the University of Florida in the 1980s, working in the university's College of Dentistry and its Gator Band office.  During the 1990s, Evans was employed at the University of Florida’s Institute of Food and Agricultural Sciences as a writer in the department of Marketing and Communications and during the late 2000s in the Institute's International Programs office.  Her title was Coordinator Educational Media/Communications and International Focus Newsletter Editor.  She was writer, editor, webmaster and web graphic designer, photographer and print-document graphic designer, marketing and public relations specialist, event coordinator, and international-visitor tour organizer.  Evans retired from the University of Florida after a 28-year career there.

Works
Sleipnir — Baen (1994), read online  As Evans' first published work, Sleipnir required ten years to produce between beginning to write and its first printing.
Far Edge of Darkness — Baen; First Edition (July 1, 1996) read online

While many assume that Sleipnir was intended to be part of a series, this is not actually true.  The novel was always intended to be a stand-alone work.  A possible sequel has been contemplated.  The ending is Heinleinian, in that it suggests action to come without actually intending for the story to continue.  While some readers find this unsatisfying, the book did not, as is sometimes reported, end on a cliffhanger.

The second novel, Far Edge of Darkness, was intended as the first half of the story and it does end with a literal cliffhanger, meaning the story is unfinished and has been since 1996. The sequel is currently in outline stage.

The "Hell's Gate" series, for which nothing has been added since 2007, is still in development.  The first two books have been published in the "Hell's Gate" series and a third book is under development.  The author apologizes to her readers, but continuing serious health problems have made writing difficult for her.

ANTHOLOGIES:

"Bolos 3: The Triumphant"
Novellas Included:
"The Farmer's Wife"
"Little Red Hen" (co-written with Robert R. Hollingsworth)
"Little Dog Gone"
(See "With David Weber" below for further details)

"Bolos 4:  Last Stand" (1996)
In this anthology, Evans wrote a fictional "historical essay" of humanity's contacts with alien races.

"Bolos 6:  Cold Steel" (2002)
In this anthology, Evans wrote the second of two novellas in the collection, titled "Though Hell Should Bar the Way".

"Worlds of Honor", in David Weber's Honor Harrington Universe:
In this anthology, Evans wrote the opening novella, "The Stray", which is a far-future murder mystery in which the sole witness is an alien incapable of producing verbal language.
(See below for further details)

With David Weber
Bolos: Book 3 The Triumphant 
In this anthology, Evans wrote 3 novellas (one in collaboration with Robert R. Hollingsworth) and David Weber wrote a fourth novella.  The works by Evans, "The Farmer's Wife", "Little Red Hen", and "Little Dog Gone", were her own work, not co-written with Weber; similarly, the novella by Weber was his own work, not written in collaboration with Evans.
Worlds of Honor" 
In this anthology, Evans wrote the opening novella, "The Stray", while writing in Weber's Honor Harrington universe.  Weber did not co-author that novella.
Hell's Gate seriesHell's Gate   (2006)Hell Hath No Fury   (2007)

With John RingoThe Road to Damascus   (read online) (2004)
NOTE:  This novel, written by Linda Evans from an outline by John Ringo, is also set in the Bolos universe created by Keith Laumer.

With Robert AsprinFor King and Country (2002)
This novel, written (as were all the Evans/Asprin collaborations) by Linda Evans from an outline by Asprin, is a stand-alone novel of time-travel and the historical "King Arthur," the 5th Century Dux Bellorum (Duke of Battle) Artorius, a Romanized Briton, fighting invasions from all four compass points approximately one century after the withdrawal of the Roman legions from Britain.

NOTE:  The "Time Scout" series below, all written by Linda Evans from outlines by Robert Asprin (which Evans changed considerably), is set in a near-future time period when time travel is made possible through gates in time.  Time travel has become a big tourism business, with "time terminals" like airport terminals, where tourists and scholars can depart for destinations such as the American "Wild West", the early Roman Empire, or Victorian London.  Unknown gates are explored by "time scouts" who searching to discover where these "gates" go.  Unstable gates can dump "downtimers" unexpectedly into the station, where they must forge a way to live, since they cannot return to their own time periods.  Other unstable gates dump even stranger surprises into the time terminals!  The titles below are listed in reverse story order.  "Time Scout", the first book, is a stand-alone novel, as is "Wagers of Sin".  However, "Ripping Time" and "The House That Jack Built" constitute one complete story, told across the two books.The House That Jack Built (2001)Ripping Time (2000)Wagers of Sin (1996)Time Scout'' (1995)

References

External links
Linda Evans at Baen Books

20th-century American novelists
21st-century American novelists
American science fiction writers
American women short story writers
American women novelists
Crawfordsville High School alumni
Flagler College alumni
Living people
1958 births
Novelists from Indiana
Women science fiction and fantasy writers
20th-century American women writers
21st-century American women writers
20th-century American short story writers
21st-century American short story writers